Jan Palinek (born 13 February 1969) is a Czech former football player. He played 334 top-flight matches in Czechoslovakia and the Czech Republic. After making 34 appearances in the Czechoslovak First League for Baník Ostrava, Palinek went on to play 300 times in the Gambrinus liga for various clubs including Drnovice, Brno and Slovácko.

Following his professional career, Palinek moved to TJ Vlčnov to play on an amateur basis.

References

External links
 

1969 births
Sportspeople from Přerov
Living people
Czechoslovak footballers
Czech footballers
Czech First League players
FC Baník Ostrava players
FK Drnovice players
FC Zbrojovka Brno players
1. FC Slovácko players
Association football defenders